George T. Manning (May 30, 1908 – December 1, 1956) was an American politician from New York.

Life
He was born on May 30, 1908. He attended Aquinas Institute and Rochester Business Institute. He engaged in the insurance business in Rochester, New York.

Manning was a member of the New York State Assembly (Monroe Co., 3rd D.) from 1939 to 1946, sitting in the 162nd, 163rd, 164th and 165th New York State Legislatures.

He was a member of the New York State Senate from 1947 until his death in 1956, sitting in the 166th, 167th, 168th, 169th and 170th New York State Legislatures.

He died on December 1, 1956, in Roswell Park Comprehensive Cancer Center (then known as Roswell Park Memorial Institute) in Buffalo, New York, of cancer.

Sources

1908 births
1956 deaths
Politicians from Rochester, New York
Republican Party New York (state) state senators
Republican Party members of the New York State Assembly
Deaths from cancer in New York (state)
20th-century American politicians